Châtillon, Switzerland may refer to:
 Châtillon, Jura, Switzerland
 Châtillon, Fribourg
Châtillon, Bern, part of the municipality of Prêles in the Canton of Berne